The Le Mans tramway is a tramway in the city of Le Mans, Pays de la Loire, France. It opened on the 17 November, 2007 and currently consists of two lines.

Rolling stock 

The design of the rolling stock was carried out by RCP Design Global agency, which formulated the general concept, fabrics, interior environment and the tram livery on behalf of Alstom.

See also 
 Trams in France
 List of town tramway systems in France

External links 
 
 SETRAM official website

Le Mans
Tram transport in France
Transport in Pays de la Loire
Le Mans